Baeturia laureli  is a species of cicada named after comedian Stan Laurel. A similar species, B. hardyi, was named after his partner Oliver Hardy.

See also
 List of organisms named after famous people (born 1800–1899)

References

Laurel and Hardy
Insects described in 1996
Chlorocystini